Statistics of Belgian First Division in the 1900–01 season.

Locations of teams

Overview
This season saw the two Groups of previous seasons merged back into one national Division.
It was contested by 9 teams, and Racing Club de Bruxelles won the championship.

League standings

Results

See also
1900–01 in Belgian football

References

1900
1900–01 in European association football leagues
1900–01 in Belgian football